The 2012 New York Red Bulls season was the club's 18th year of existence as well as its 17th season in Major League Soccer, the top-flight of American soccer.

After a disappointing 2011 season, Red Bulls looked to bounce back to their 2010 form which saw them win the Eastern Conference. In 2011, New York finished fifth place in the conference and tenth overall in MLS, qualifying as the final team for the playoffs. The club lost in the two-legged quarterfinals of the post-season playoffs to the eventual MLS Cup winner Los Angeles Galaxy.

Team uniform

Overview

November 2011 
The 2012 season began in earnest for MLS immediately after the 2011 MLS Cup final. The following day clubs submitted their list of players protected from selection by Montreal Impact in the 2011 MLS Expansion Draft held on November 23, 2011. No Red Bull players were chosen by Montreal in the draft. However, on the same day MLS clubs waived players, effectively releasing them from their contracts. Through waivers, New York parted ways with goalkeeper Alex Horwath; defenders Mike Jones, Tyler Lassiter, and Teddy Schneider; and midfielders John Rooney and Marcos Paullo.

One week later, the club declined the 2012 options on goalkeeper Bouna Coundoul, defender Chris Albright, and defender Carlos Mendes, making all three players available for the 2011 MLS Re-Entry Draft. Mendes had been the longest-tenured member of Red Bulls and was the last player remaining from when the franchise was known as New York MetroStars. He ranks among the club's all-time leaders in games and minutes. Mendes was chosen by Columbus Crew in Stage 1 of the Re-Entry Draft on December 5, 2011. Coundoul and Albright were not selected and became free agents.

The same day the club confirmed the status of 2011 Red Bull goalkeeper Greg Sutton, who was also available in the Re-Entry Draft. Sutton had been loaned to then-North American Soccer League side Montreal Impact in July 2011. At season's end, Montreal exercised an option to acquire Sutton's MLS rights but subsequently declined his 2012 option.

December 2011 
The club signed defender Connor Lade to a Home Grown Player contract on December 5, 2011. The diminutive Lade spent parts of several years with Red Bull Academy. The following week New York announced that it had declined the 2012 contract option on midfielder Stéphane Auvray.

January 2012 
Red Bulls signed defender John Borrajo from Norwegian side Hamarkameratene on January 5, 2012. Borrajo had spent time at Red Bulls Academy before heading overseas. A much bigger move was confirmed by the club the next day: the short-term loan of star striker Thierry Henry to his former club, English juggernaut Arsenal. The loan lasts until late February 2012.

The club was busy on SuperDraft day despite having only one selection. First, the rumored signing of Swedish defender Markus Holgersson was officially announced. The central defender is expected to step into a starting role for New York. The day's second announcement was the acquisition of forward Kenny Cooper from Portland Timbers in exchange for a first-round pick in the 2013 MLS SuperDraft and allocation money. The addition of Cooper to the forward corps led to speculation about the future of Juan Agudelo with the club. As far as the actual SuperDraft, Red Bulls used its lone selection (#31) to choose goalkeeper Ryan Meara. The first goalkeeper chosen in the 2012 SuperDraft, Meara is considered a good bet to make the squad.

The following week the club drafted three players in the 2012 MLS Supplemental Draft: defender Mike Volk, midfielder Cristian Barreiro, and midfielder Nate Polak. The club also re-signed defender Stephen Keel to a new contract.

On January 19, coach Hans Backe confirmed that goalkeeper Frank Rost would not be returning to the club. The following day oft-injured veteran midfielder Carl Robinson retired and joined the coaching staff of Vancouver Whitecaps FC. These moves freed up one designated player slot (Rost) and two much needed international roster slots for Red Bulls. Early the following week, New York signed goalkeeper Jeremy Vuolo from Finnish side AC Oulu.

January 26 saw the official departure of defender Tim Ream to Bolton Wanderers of the English Premier League after a month-long transfer saga. A virtual unknown when selected by red Bulls in the second round of the 2010 MLS SuperDraft, Ream established himself as a starter from day one, finished his first season as a finalist for the 2010 MLS Rookie of the Year award, and secured a place with the United States men's national soccer team. Bolton paid a record transfer fee for an American defender, reportedly in the $3 million range, to sign Ream. Red Bulls will receive 2/3 of the transfer amount and can use $650,000 of that as allocation money to override the MLS salary cap.

New York put some of the Ream transfer funds to immediate use when four days later the club traded allocation money to Chicago Fire for the MLS rights to defender Wilman Conde, whom New York signed immediately. Conde is expected to start in central defense with fellow January signing Markus Holgersson.

Red Bulls finished the month by re-signing stalwart midfielder Joel Lindpere to a multi-year contract on January 31. The club Most Valuable Player in 2010, Lindpere started all 37 MLS matches in 2011.

February 
The first signing by the club after the start of training camp was draft pick goalkeeper Ryan Meara on February 6. Four days later New York signed young Icelandic midfielder Victor Pálsson to the squad.

The club surprised fans on February 17 by waiving second-year homegrown players Matt Kassel and Šaćir Hot. While 2012 playing time for the two was likely to be limited, the young players were just signed from Red Bulls Academy in 2011 and did not count against the team's salary cap. Also, team captain Thierry Henry returned from his short-term loan to Arsenal the same day that Kassel and Hot were waived.

March 
Pre-season concluded in early March with the status of some key players still unresolved. Forward Luke Rodgers was still stuck in England unable to obtain a work visa to return to the United States; newly acquired defender Wilman Conde picked up an injury leaving his status for the first month of the regular season unknown; and forward Juan Agudelo was away from the club for an extended period as he trained with the U.S. Under-23 squad.

In the days just before the regular season began, New York made official the signings of defender Tyler Ruthven, midfielder Brandon Barklage and forwards José Angulo and Jhonny Arteaga. Later in the month the club signed midfielder Ryan Maduro to the roster.

The season started poorly with a 2–1 defeat at FC Dallas on March 11, 2012. A sluggish start led to a 2-goal deficit at the hour mark. The introduction of Kenny Cooper sparked some life into the club and the Red Bull substitute scored late in the match to close the final margin to one. The following week Red Bulls had to travel to Real Salt Lake. Another sub-par performance resulted in a 2–0 defeat.

On March 25, New York Red Bulls home opener, the team finally showed glimpses of unity and talents by sweeping Colorado Rapids 4–1 in front of 21,024 passionate supporters. Thierry Henry scored two goals and picked up an assist, winning him the MLS Player of the Week award. Strike partner Kenny Cooper added two goals as well. A week after the dominating performance in home opener, Red Bulls host Montreal Impact in Red Bull Arena. They started poorly with many mistakes in the first half. The scoreline reads 2–2 at half time. After the inspiring talk from team captain Thierry Henry, Red Bulls put on a performance fans expected from them. Thierry Henry added 2 goals and 1 creative back-heel assist in the second half, which earn him his first-ever MLS hat trick since joining New York Red Bulls. He was again been rewarded the MLS Player of the Week with his heroic performance and leadership on and off the field. Also, his hat trick against Impact launched him to the top of MLS Golden Boot race with 5 goals in pocket.

Away from the field, the end of March was not kind to New York. Striker Juan Agudelo injured his knee while with the U.S. U-23 team during Olympic qualifying and surgery was required. The time frame for his return to Red Bulls was 6 weeks. Worse still, the club announced on March 30 that English striker Luke Rodgers was denied a work visa to enter the United States. As a result, the club transferred Rodgers to Lillestrøm SK of Norway. The stocky Englishman had become a fan favorite during the 2011 season due to his work ethic and goal scoring abilities.

MLS Results for March: 2 victories, 0 draws, 2 losses; 6 points
MLS Results Season-to-Date: 2 victories, 0 draws, 2 losses; 6 points, 2nd in Eastern Conference (MLS) through 4 matches

April 
On April 5, Thierry Henry received the MLS Player of the Month award for his outstanding performance in March. He received 17 out of 25 media votes, beating the second-placed Joe Cannon by big margin. Team captain Henry seemed no sign to stop his goal-scoring streak by adding 2 goals and 1 assist against Columbus Crew at Crew Stadium on April 7. His brace maintains him as the leader in MLS Golden Boot race with 7 goals in 5 games. His strike partner Kenny Cooper and Chris Wondolowski are not far behind with 6 goals each. History has been made when Thierry Henry was awarded another MLS Player of the Week, making it three consecutive Player of the Week for the striker.

On April 14, the Red Bulls hosted San Jose Earthquakes and played to a 2–2 draw. The game featured the three leading MLS goal scorers at the time (Henry, Cooper, and Wondolowski of the Earthquakes). Henry set up Cooper to open the scoring only five minutes into the match. Dax McCarty scored for the first time in his career, and Wondolowski scored the tying goal for San Jose.  A week later, Red Bulls travelled to Washington to face D.C. United. The home team controlled the play in the rain and won 4–1. Henry scored on a free kick, but not until after Chris Pontius scored three times and Nick DeLeon scored once for D.C. United.

New York hosted the New England Revolution on April 28 and posted their first clean sheet of the year in a 1-0 win.  Henry scored the eventual deciding goal for the Red Bulls in the seventh minute, but would leave the game in the first half with a hamstring injury. The Red Bulls young, inexperienced defense and rookie goalkeeper Ryan Meara were able to make Henry's goal stand, and the Red Bulls snapped their two-game winless streak.

MLS Results for April: 2 victories, 1 draws, 1 losses
MLS Results Season-to-Date: 4 victories, 1 draws, 3 losses; 13 points, 3rd in Eastern Conference (MLS) through 8 matches

May 

The Red Bulls began May without their leading scorer, Henry, and a "makeshift" defense. They traveled to California for a match against Los Angeles Galaxy on May 5. Joel Lindpere scored the only goal of the game for the Red Bulls while the defense kept Galaxy from scoring en route to a 1-0 win.  The Red Bulls then had to play on short rest on May 9 at home against the Houston Dynamo. For the third straight game, New York was able to score early and play tight defense to win 1–0. The goal was scored by forward Cooper.

On Sunday, May 13, New York traveled to Pennsylvania to play the Philadelphia Union in their third game in eight days.  Still without Henry and Rafael Márquez, the Red Bulls were able to win the match 3–2 in comeback fashion. New York scored first on a goal from Lindpere in the 17th minute, but Lionard Pajoy scored the next two to give Philadelphia a 2–1 lead. The lead would not hold, however. Philadelphia was forced to play with ten men after Freddy Adu was sent off late in the first half, and New York was able to come back to win. After a goal by Markus Holgersson in the 68th minute, Cooper netted the game winner in the 78th minute. The win was New York's fourth and moved them into first place in the Eastern Conference.

On May 17, New York traded up-and-coming striker Juan Agudelo for defensemen Heath Pearce of Chivas USA. Agudelo, a Red Bulls Academy product, played little so far in his career with New York. He had no goals in 2012 and six in 2011 in 12 starts. Pearce had 35 caps for the US National team up to this point in his career.

The Red Bulls traveled to Montreal to face the Impact on May 19.  The Red Bulls were able to end Montreal's season-long unbeaten streak at home by winning 2-1.  After Cooper scored on a penalty kick in the first half, Dane Richards scored on a rebound opportunity in the second half while the Red Bull were playing with ten men. On short rest, New York would host Chivas USA on May 23 and face the recently traded Agudelo. Juan Pablo Ángel scored first for Chivas in the 47th minute, but Cooper answered in the 56th to tie the game when he converted a low cross from Richards into the box.  New York was unable to find a winner despite being able to apply pressure for much of the rest of the game.  The draw snapped the Red Bull's five-game win streak—their longest in nine years.

MLS Results for May: 4 victories, 1 draws, 0 losses
MLS Results Season-to-Date: 8 victories, 2 draws, 3 losses; 26 points, 1st in Eastern Conference (MLS) through 13 matches

September 
Team captain Thierry Henry shone in the matches against Columbus Crew and Toronto FC, which earned him another two MLS Player of the Week. He provided two goals and one assist against Columbus Crew with a goal scoring directly off the corner in second half stoppage time. The legendary striker scored an assist hat-trick before scoring a 25 yards one-time chipped shot against Toronto FC.

MLS Results Season-to-Date: 15 victories, 8 draws, 8 losses; 53 points, 2nd in Eastern Conference (MLS) through 31 matches

Team information

Squad 
As of August 17, 2012.

Player movement

Transfers

In

Out

Loans

Out

Club

Team stats 

Italic: denotes no longer with club.

Updated as of June 24.

Match results

Pre-season 
Kickoff times are in EST.

Desert Diamond Cup

Standings

Matches

Friendlies

Major League Soccer

Eastern Conference table

Results Summary

Results by round

Matches 
Kickoff times are in EDT.

MLS Cup Playoffs

Kickoff times are in EDT.

U.S. Open Cup 

Kickoff times are in EDT.

Miscellany

Allocation ranking 
New York is in the #11 position in the MLS Allocation Ranking. The allocation ranking is the mechanism used to determine which MLS club has first priority to acquire a U.S. National Team player who signs with MLS after playing abroad, or a former MLS player who returns to the league after having gone to a club abroad for a transfer fee. A ranking can be traded, provided that part of the compensation received in return is another club's ranking.

International roster spots 
It is believed that New York has 11 MLS International Roster Slots for use in the 2012 season. It is believed the three extra slots that New York possesses were acquired from the Houston Dynamo franchise (then based in San Jose) in January 2005 in exchange for Ricardo Clark, again from Houston in March 2009, and from Colorado Rapids in the September 2010 Macoumba Kandji trade. The trade of this spot was not included in the press release.

Future draft pick trades 
Future picks acquired: *2013 MLS SuperDraft conditional draft pick from San Jose Earthquakes; *Unspecified year conditional draft pick from Toronto FC.
Future picks traded: *2013 MLS SuperDraft Round 1 to Portland Timbers; *2013 MLS SuperDraft Round 2 to Sporting Kansas City; *2014 MLS Supplemental Draft Round 2 pick to Los Angeles Galaxy.

References 

New York Red Bulls seasons
New York Red Bulls
New York Red Bulls
Red bulls